ABC Pilbara is an ABC Local Radio station based in Karratha.  Formerly known as ABC North West WA, the station broadcasts to the Gascoyne and parts of the Pilbara regions of Western Australia.  This includes the towns of Port Hedland, Carnarvon, Exmouth, Newman and Tom Price.

The station began as 6KP in 1988 and now broadcasts through the following main AM transmitters:

6KP 702 AM Karratha
6CA 846 AM Carnarvon
6MN 567 AM Newman
6PH 603 AM Port Hedland
6PN 567 AM Pannawonica
6PU 567 AM Paraburdoo
6TP 567 AM Tom Price
6XM 1188 AM Exmouth

There are also a number of low power FM transmitters.

When local programs are not broadcast, ABC Pilbara is a relay of 720 ABC Perth.

From 8 April 2019, the name of the station was changed to ABC Pilbara from its former name of ABC North West WA to better identify the station's local coverage area.

On 3 May 2022, ABC Pilbara's new studios at The Pelago on Sharpe Avenue in Karratha were officially opened after relocating from their former premises in De Grey Place.  According to the ABC, the new location will provide better protection from cyclones enabling the station to provide uninterrupted emergency coverage from the new studios. A new mini-bureau was also opened at Carnarvon on the same day, one of five which had already opened as part of the ABC's regional expansion.  The two Carnarvon-based reporters will cover areas such as Shark Bay, Exmouth and Gascoyne Junction.

References

See also
 List of radio stations in Australia

North West WA
Radio stations in Western Australia
Pilbara
Gascoyne